The International Confederation of Architectural Museums (ICAM) is an organisation of architectural museums, centres and collections, dedicated to fostering links between all those interested in promoting the better understanding of architecture. It was founded in 1979.

Members 

Austria
Architekturzentrum Wien

Canada
Canadian Centre for Architecture

Czech Republic
Cabinet of Architecture, Ostrava

Estonia 
Museum of Estonian Architecture

Finland
Alvar Aalto Museum
Museum of Finnish Architecture

France
Cité de l'Architecture et du Patrimoine

Germany
Bauhaus Dessau Foundation
German Architecture Museum

Latvia
Latvian Museum of Architecture

Poland
Museum of Architecture, Wrocław

Slovenia
 Museum of Architecture and Design
Sweden
Swedish Centre for Architecture and Design

Switzerland
Swiss Architecture Museum

United Kingdom
Sir John Soane's Museum
University of Brighton Design Archives
Victoria and Albert Museum

United States
Avery Architectural and Fine Arts Library, Columbia University
Chicago Architecture Foundation
Fallingwater Museum
Harvard Design School
The Museum of Modern Art
The Athenaeum of Philadelphia
The Getty Research Institute
The Heinz Architectural Center Carnegie Museum of Art
The Library of Congress
The MIT Museum
The Wolfsonian–Florida International University
University Art Museum, UCSB
University of California, Berkeley Environmental Design Archives
University of Pennsylvania
Virginia Center for Architecture at Branch House, Richmond, Virginia
Yale University
A+D Museum in Los Angeles
Richard Meier & Partners Architects Model Museum

References

External links 
ICAM Website

Museum associations and consortia
Architecture organizations
Architecture museums
Organizations established in 1979